Union Pacific 3985, also known as the "Challenger", is a four-cylinder simple articulated 4-6-6-4 "Challenger"-type steam locomotive built in July 1943 by the American Locomotive Company (ALCO) of Schenectady, New York, for the Union Pacific Railroad. No. 3985 is one of only two Challengers still in existence and the only one to have operated in excursion service.

No. 3985 operated in revenue service until 1957. It was then stored in the roundhouse in Cheyenne, Wyoming, until 1975, when it was placed outdoors beside the Cheyenne depot. In March 1981, after a group of Union Pacific employees restored the locomotive to operating condition, it was placed into excursion service as part of the Union Pacific's heritage fleet and became the world's largest operational steam locomotive. Mechanical problems took it offline in 2010, after which it was stored at the Union Pacific's Steam Shops in Cheyenne. 

On May 1, 2019, the title of largest operational steam locomotive was passed to the newly restored 4-8-8-4 "Big Boy" Union Pacific 4014. Because of its poor mechanical condition, No. 3985 was officially retired from excursion service in 2020. In April 2022, UP officials announced that the company would donate the locomotive to the Railroading Heritage of Midwest America (RRHMA), which is now restoring the locomotive to operating condition.

History

Design
Designed by UP chief mechanical engineer Otto Jabelmann in 1941, UP 3985 was part of the second order of this second version of the Challenger. The design drew on recent experience with the enormous 4-8-8-4 Big Boy locomotives, and resulted in a locomotive in that in working order weighed some  accompanied by a tender that weighed  when two-thirds loaded. The Challenger class was intended to speed freight operations on the 0.82% grades across Wyoming, while the 1.14% Wasatch Range climb east from Ogden was to be conquered by the Big Boys without helpers. The Challengers and Big Boys arrived on the scene just as traffic was surging in preparation for American participation in World War II.

Revenue service and retirement (1943–1957)

UP 3985 was part of the 4664-4 group of Challengers built in 1943. Although this group consisted of 31 locomotives, only 25 went to the Union Pacific. 

UP 3985 operated in its last revenue train service in 1957, and the locomotive was officially retired in 1962. The following year, No. 3985 was repainted and put on display in Cheyenne, Wyoming, for the 1963 National Railway Historical Society (NRHS) Convention alongside Big Boy No. 4023 and 4-8-4 "Northern" No. 844, which had been in excursion service since 1960. After the convention, the locomotive was stored inside the UP's Cheyenne roundhouse along with No. 4023. In 1975, No. 3985 was placed on outdoor display beside the Cheyenne depot.

First restoration and excursion career with UP (1981–2010)

Beginning in 1979, a group of Union Pacific employee-volunteers started work on restoring the locomotive and it was returned to operating condition in March 1981. The locomotive made its first excursion run in May during Railfair 1981, where it attended the opening of the California State Railroad Museum in Sacramento, along with No. 844.

No. 3985, originally built to burn coal, was converted to burn No. 5 fuel oil in 1990 to reduce maintenance stops during excursion trips. That same year, the locomotive pulled a 143-car doublestack train between Cheyenne and North Platte, Nebraska, per special request by American President Lines. 

In 1991, No. 3985 went to Railfair 1991 along with No. 844 and DDA40X No. 6936. The excursion also included UP 4-6-0 No. 1243 on a flatbed. The next year, the 3985 went to the National Railroad Historical Society's convention in San Jose, California. It participated in activities with Southern Pacific 4-8-4 No. 4449 and SP 4-6-2 No. 2472.  

In November 1992, the locomotive was selected to pull the Clinchfield Santa Train, an excursion that ran on CSX trackage. For the run, the locomotive masqueraded as Clinchfield Railroad No. 676; the number was as a continuation of the CRR's E-3 locomotives, which were numbered 670–675.

In May 1993, the locomotive masqueraded as sister engine No. 3967 as part of the 40th anniversary of the Rocky Mountain Railroad Club excursion, in which the original 3967 pulled the same excursion on May 17, 1953. During the same run, the engine was renumbered again to 3718, the number being a continuation of the few 4664-4 locomotives that were converted to run on oil in 1945, which were numbered 3708–3717.

In July, No. 3985 travelled from Cheyenne to Omaha, Nebraska, where the locomotive was scheduled to pull an excursion to Chicago, Illinois for the 1993 NRHS Convention. A number of UP's routes in the Midwest took a huge hit during that year's Great Flood, including the Sedalia Subdivision in Missouri, where No. 3985 tiptoed through enroute to Chicago. After the convention ended, the locomotive travelled to Kansas City, where UP experienced a power-shortage; No. 3985 was used to pull honest freight trains around the area prior to its return to Cheyenne in August.

In May 1994, No. 3985 pulled an excursion on California's Cajon Pass with the Union Pacific's A-B-A set of EMD E9 units during its 1994 tour. In 1999, the 3985 double-headed with No. 844 on the way to Railfair 1999. After the event, the 3985 was forced to pull the return trip with the 844 dead in tow after the FEF-3 suffered a tube failure on June 24 while on display.

Throughout its career, No. 3985 was station and serviced at Cheyenne, along with other equipment in the UP's heritage collection. It remained in the UP's maintenance shop in 2007 and underwent repairs in 2008.

In September and October of 2010, No. 3985 embarked on the Missouri River Eagle Tour, which would become its last tour in excursion service with the Union Pacific. As part of the tour, the locomotive was selected to pull the Ringling Brothers and Barnum & Bailey Circus train from Cheyenne to Denver, Colorado, where the circus held a special performance to celebrate P.T. Barnum's birthday. No. 3985 made its final run with the UP on October 14, 2010, after which it was taken out of service for repairs and placed into storage.

Retirement from excursion service with UP (2010–2022)
In December 2018, Union Pacific asked the Federal Railroad Administration (FRA) for waivers to exempt Nos. 3985, 844 and 4014 from federal Positive Train Control (PTC) requirements; in February 2019, the FRA officials responded that such waivers were not needed.

In January 2020, Union Pacific officially retired No. 3985 from excursion service. The UP steam program manager, Ed Dickens, said the team felt that maintaining three steam locomotives was too much for them to handle. No. 3985 also needed an extensive overhaul due to its poor mechanical condition as No. 4014 officially replaced No. 3985 in excursion service.

Acquisition by RRHMA and second restoration (2022-present) 
On April 28, 2022, UP officials announced that the company would donate No. 3985—along with 2-10-2 No. 5511, Centennial No. 6936, an unpowered E9 locomotive, and other rolling stock from their heritage fleet—to the Railroading Heritage of Midwest America (RRHMA) in Silvis, Illinois. RRHMA aims to restore the Nos. 3985 and 5511 steam locomotives to operating condition. On May 13, 2022, RRHMA launched a fundraiser to raise money for the work. In November of that same year, UP moved 3985 and the rest of the donated equipment to the RRHMA's large shop facility in Silvis, Illinois. In January 2023, the RRHMA announced that the restoration of No. 3985 had begun.

Notes and References

Notes

References

Bibliography

Further reading

External links

 Challenger No. 3985
 Locomotive #3985 – Challenger
 UP Steam

Individual locomotives of the United States
3985
ALCO locomotives
Railway locomotives introduced in 1943
Standard gauge locomotives of the United States
Preserved steam locomotives of Illinois